A Sligo County Council election was held in County Sligo in Ireland on 24 May 2019 as part of that year's local elections. All 18 councillors were elected for a five-year term of office from 3 local electoral areas (LEAs) by single transferable vote.

The 2018 LEA boundary review kept the two municipal districts used in the 2014 elections, while transferring one seat from Ballymote–Tubbercurry to Sligo and splitting the latter into two LEAs.  The changes were enacted by statutory instrument (S.I.) No. 632/2018.

A total of 35 candidates contested the county's 18 seats, of whom fifteen were outgoing councillors. Fianna Fáil and Fine Gael each had nine candidates. Sinn Féin had three, Solidarity/People Before Profit had two, while  and one each for the Labour Party, Green Party and Renua.  The nine independent candidates included Declan Bree, who was County Sligo's longest serving councillor. Thirteen of the fifteen candidates who were outgoing councillors were re-elected, including Bree who was first elected in 1974 to both the County Council and Sligo Borough Council.

Several seats were decided by very narrow margins, and result was that Fine Gael gained three seats to become the largest party, with six seats. Fianna Fáil lost three seats, and the other group totals were unchanged. The long-serving Bree was re-elected in the Sligo–Strandhill LEA.

Results by party

Results by local electoral area

Ballymote–Tubbercurry

The Fine Gael director of elections made a formal complaint about the large increase in the number of postal votes cast — 252 compared to 131 in the same district in the 2014 election and 20 and 17 in the other two districts in 2019. The ensuing Garda investigation into potential electoral fraud was still ongoing in February 2022.

Sligo–Drumcliff

Sligo–Strandhill

Results by gender

Footnotes

Sources

References

2019 Irish local elections
2019